Mihai Şulţ (born 7 March 1933) is a Romanian wrestler. He competed in the men's Greco-Roman featherweight at the 1960 Summer Olympics.

References

1933 births
Living people
Romanian male sport wrestlers
Olympic wrestlers of Romania
Wrestlers at the 1960 Summer Olympics
Sportspeople from Timișoara